Daniel Eduardo Mammana is a retired Argentinian football (soccer) defender who played professionally in Argentina and the United States.

In 1972, Mammana played for River Plate.  In 1976, he signed with the San Antonio Thunder of the North American Soccer League.  However, he saw no games with the first team.  In 1977, he was a first team All Star with the Sacramento Spirits.  That year the Spirits went to the championship game where they fell to the New Jersey Americans.  In 1979, he played for the Columbus Magic.  He was again a first team All Star.  In 1980, he played for the Cleveland Cobras.

Yearly Awards
All-Star Team - 1977, 1979

References

External links
American stats

American Soccer League (1933–1983) players
Argentine footballers
Argentine expatriate footballers
Cleveland Cobras players
Columbus Magic players
Detroit Express (1981–1983) players
North American Soccer League (1968–1984) players
Club Atlético River Plate footballers
Sacramento Gold (1976–1980) players
San Antonio Thunder players
Utah Golden Spikers players
Living people
Association football defenders
Year of birth missing (living people)